Guillaume Delorme (born 31 May 1978 in France) is a French actor.

Theater
In 2005, Delorme replaced Aurelien Wiik in the play The Amazons. Delorme began playing Brice - a trainee Lieutenant Gerard Bonaventure - since the episode broadcast on 12 September 2007.

Filmography

In the series The Life In Front Of Us (French title La Vie Devant Nous), Delorme played the role of Bartholomew, a disk jockey who is more interested in the world by night than school.

References

Living people
1978 births
French male television actors
French male stage actors
Cours Florent alumni
Place of birth missing (living people)